Sayyid Hossein Naghavi-Hosseini is an Iranian conservative politician who represents Varamin in the Parliament of Iran since 2008 to 2020. He serves as the spokesperson of the parliament's commission on national security and foreign policy.

He is member of the Front of Islamic Revolution Stability.

References

1960 births
Living people
Members of the 8th Islamic Consultative Assembly
Members of the 9th Islamic Consultative Assembly
Members of the 10th Islamic Consultative Assembly
Front of Islamic Revolution Stability politicians
People from Varamin